Un secret may refer to:

Un secret, a poem by Félix Arvers
A Secret, a 2007 French film